China Coast Guard (CCG) is the maritime security, search and rescue, and law enforcement service branch of the People's Armed Police of China. It is currently the world's largest coast guard.

Function 

The CCG is known to perform mostly coastal and oceanic search and rescue or patrols, including anti-smuggling operations. During wartime it may be placed under the operational control of the People's Liberation Army Navy.

Roles 
Roles of the CCG are diverse but include:
 Patrol of territorial waters and disputed territories
 Anti-smuggling, anti-piracy
 Maritime policing and ship inspections
 Harbor and coastal security
 Research and survey
 Search and Rescue
 Fisheries protection
 Grey-zone operations (often alongside the PLAN and People's Armed Forces Maritime Militia)

Command 
After the reform in 2018, CCG consists commands (sub-bureaus) and divisions (local bureaus). The name in the parentheses is for general use.

Training 
The Chinese Coast Guard conducts periodic joint-training sessions with other navies, including the US Coast Guard service. The Chinese Coast Guard has also participated in the annual North Pacific Coast Guard Agencies Forum in Alaska, along with US, Canadian, Japanese, South Korean, and Russian Coast Guards. As part of an exchange program, members of the Chinese Coast Guard service have been assigned to serve on U.S. Coast Guard cutters.

History
The China Coast Guard was formed in 2013 from the maritime branch of the People's Armed Police Border Security Force and the other maritime law enforcement agencies in China. The unified Coast Guard is commanded by the State Oceanic Administration and has been in operation since July 2013. On July 1, 2018, the China Coast Guard was transferred from civilian control of the State Council and the State Oceanic Administration, to the People's Armed Police, ultimately placing it under the command of the Central Military Commission.

In June 2018, the China Coast Guard was granted maritime rights and law enforcement akin civilian law enforcement agencies in order to carry out contrast of illegal activities, keep peace and order, as well as safeguarding security at sea, when performing duties related to the use of marine resources, protection of marine environment, regulation of fishery, and anti-smuggling.

In 2019, the United States issued a warning to China over aggressive and unsafe action by their Coast Guard and maritime militia.

The Coast Guard Law allows CCG ships to use lethal force on foreign ship that do not obey order to leave Chinese waters. It took effect on February 1, 2021.

Equipment

Vessels 

Chinese Coast Guard ships are painted white with blue stripe and wording China Coast Guard in English and Chinese.

Typical Coast Guard ships include the 130 ton Type 218 patrol boat (100 boats), armed with twin 14.5mm machine guns, assorted speedboats, and few larger patrol ships.  Up until very recently, the largest ship in Chinese Coast Guard service was the 1,500 ton Type 718 cutter (31101 Pudong).

In March 2007, it was reported that the PLAN had transferred 2 Type 728 cutter (44102, ex-509 Changde; 46103, ex-510 Shaoxing) to the Coast Guard and re-numbered them as 1002 & 1003.  At the time these ships were the largest vessels in the China Coast Guard inventory.

In May 2017, it was reported that China had deployed the 12,000 ton China Coast Guard (CCG) 3901 cutter No. 1123 to patrol its claimed islands in the disputed South China Sea. The CCG 3901 cutter is the world's biggest coast guard cutter, and is larger than the U.S. Navy's 9,800 ton Ticonderoga-class guided-missile cruisers and its 8,300-9,300 ton Arleigh Burke-class guided missile destroyers. The CCG 3901 cutter is armed with 76mm H/PJ-26 rapid fire naval guns, two auxiliary guns, and two anti-aircraft guns.

In 2022, the Coast Guard received 22 coastal defense Type 056 corvette from the Chinese Navy.
CCG ships are named "Haijing-XX", where XX is a number.

Personnel 
CCG ships are staffed by People’s Armed Police personnel. China Coast Guard Academy is a dedicated institution that provides training for personnels to enter the CCG.

See also 

 Coast Guard Administration (Taiwan)
 People's Armed Police
 People's Liberation Army Navy
 People's Liberation Army Navy Coastal Defense Force
 China Maritime Safety Administration takes on the navigation safety and control duties, including harbormaster powers in most ports. It was not merged with the new coast guard in 2013.
 China Marine Surveillance Defunct in July 2013. The present China Coast Guard is a unified force that conducts law-enforcement operations in waters administered by China.
 People’s Armed Forces Maritime Militia

References

External links 

 

 
Military of the People's Republic of China
People's Armed Police
Reserve forces
Law enforcement agencies of China
Auxiliary military units
Coast guards
State Oceanic Administration